Larki Punjaban (Urdu: , (lit Punjabi Girl) is a 2003 Pakistani Urdu film directed by Syed Noor and starring Babar Ali, Saima, and Shamyl Khan.

Plot
A simple, love story between a Sikh girl (Saima) and a Muslim boy Shamyl Khan.

In August 1947, both Pakistan and India got their independence. Partition lines were drawn on the map of the British Raj, dividing not only the subcontinent but also provinces, in particular Punjab. The results of partition were catastrophic. All in the name of religion and nationalism,  people who had lived together in harmony for centuries committed mindless acts of violence against each other resulting in over one million deaths that included Sikhs, Muslims and Hindus. An estimated 75,000 women were raped and over twelve million people were uprooted. Hindus and Sikhs migrated to India and Muslims to Pakistan.

During these troubled times, there were a select few who did not give in to the acts of barbarism.
One such person was a young Muslim man who refused to participate in the fires of hate and destruction burning around him. During the hostilities, he found a young Sikh girl who had been separated from her family. Risking the anger of the mobs, he brought her home and offered her sanctuary. As the fires of hate began to burn out, families began to come to terms with their loss of the loved ones on both sides. Those who could not be found were presumed dead. The young girl was touched by the way the boy had protected her against the ruthless mobs, risking his own life. Eventually they fell in love. She converted to Islam and they married.

Years later, this girl becomes a dying grandmother herself and her last wish is to meet her family, back in India. Having made some enquires, she discovered that her family had migrated to Chandigarh, India.
 
Knowing her family would disown her, if they discovered that she had converted to Islam, 
she contacts her sister, pretending to be a long lost Muslim friend and invited her and her 
family to come to Lahore for a religious pilgrimage to 'Nankana Sahib' a highly revered Sikh Temple, where thousands of Sikhs travel to visit it every year.

The Sikh family comes to Lahore where the two sisters live together as friends, not knowing about their real relationship as sisters. During their stay with the Muslim family, history began to repeat itself. Preetam, daughter of the Sikh family started to get friendly with Shamil Khan, the son of the Muslim family. When the Sikh family discovers that a relationship was blossoming, they quickly return to Chandigarh, however, the young couple keep in touch on the telephone and the Internet and their love grows stronger.

Preetam's family, realizing the potential problems, send her off to Malaysia to marry her fiancé. Shamil is heart broken at suddenly losing contact with Preetam. Shamil's family, watching his despair, persuade him to travel to Malaysia to complete his education. 

As fate would have it, Shamil sees Preetam in Kuala Lumpur, only a few days before she is due to marry. What can they do? Run away together and face the wrath of their families ? Or accept the decision of their elders and sacrifice their love for each other? Can their love, cultural barriers survive the pressures of culture, tradition, inbred hatred and religion of their elders? As in fables, will love conquer all or will the harsh realities of life suffocate the young lovers into submission?

Film business
The film did an average amount of business at the box office.

Cast
 Babar Ali
 Saima
 Shamyl Khan
 Rashid Mehmood
 Rasheed Naz
 Tariq Shah
 Azhar Rangeela
 Bahar Begum
 Naghma Begum
 Habib

Awards and recognition

References

External links

2000s Urdu-language films
2003 films
Pakistani drama films
Films set in Lahore
Films directed by Syed Noor
Films scored by Zain
Urdu-language Pakistani films
Lux Style Award winners